Odites citrantha is a moth in the family Depressariidae. It was described by Edward Meyrick in 1908. It is found in South Africa, where it has been recorded from KwaZulu-Natal.

The wingspan is about 21 mm. The forewings are clear yellow with the discal stigmata minute and blackish. The hindwings are ochreous whitish.

References

Endemic moths of South Africa
Moths described in 1908
Odites
Taxa named by Edward Meyrick